Kid Gloves is a 1990 computer game for the Amiga and Atari ST published by Millennium Interactive. A flick-screen platform game, Kid Gloves involves the player progressing through a series of themed single-screen stages. The game was cover-mounted on the second issue of Amiga Power magazine in 1991.

References

External links
 Kid Gloves at Lemon Amiga
 Kid Gloves at Atari Mania

1990 video games
Amiga games
Atari ST games
Video games scored by David Whittaker
Video games developed in the United Kingdom
Millennium Interactive games
Platform games
Single-player video games